The American was made by American Cyclecar Co. of Detroit, Michigan in 1914. It had a 4-cylinder engine of 1.2 liters, and featured a friction transmission and chain drive. The headlights were inserted into the fenders, a feature later associated with the Pierce-Arrow. The make was superseded by the Trumbull.

References
^ G. Marshall Naul, "American (iii)", in G.N. Georgano, ed., The Complete Encyclopedia of Motorcars 1885-1968  (New York: E.P. Dutton and Co., 1974), pp. 41.

1910s cars
Defunct motor vehicle manufacturers of the United States
Cyclecars
Motor vehicle manufacturers based in Michigan